The 2017 Hawke's Bay Cup was the 4th edition of the invitational Hawke's Bay Cup competition. It took place between 31 March–9 April 2017 in Hastings,  New Zealand. A total of four teams competed for the title.

New Zealand won the tournament for the second time after defeating Japan 3–0 in the final. Australia won the third place match by defeating United States 3–1 in a penalty shoot-out following a 1–1 draw.

Teams
Including New Zealand, 4 teams were invited by the New Zealand Hockey Federation to participate in the tournament.

Results

Pool

Classification

Third and fourth place

Final

Statistics

Final standings

Goalscorers
3 goals

 Madi Ratcliffe
 Samantha Harrison

2 goals

 Motomi Kawamura
 Yuri Nagai
 Brooke Neal
 Kirsten Pearce
 Alyssa Parker
 Caitlin Van Sickle

1 goal

 Laura Barden
 Jane Claxton
 Ashlea Fey
 Kate Hanna
 Jordyn Holzberger
 Emily Smith
 Yu Asai
 Yudu Hazuki
 Mami Karino
 Yukari Mano
 Kelsey Smith
 Rose Keddell
 Amy Robinson
 Olivia Merry
 Rachel McCann
 Amanda Dinunzio
 Melissa Gonzalez
 Ashley Hoffman
 Erin Matson
 Kathleen Sharkey
 Michelle Vittese
 Jill Witmer

References

External links

2016
2017 in women's field hockey
2017 in New Zealand women's sport
2017 in Japanese women's sport
2017 in Australian women's field hockey
2017 in American women's sports